Bonka is a clone of the arcade video game Space Panic released for the Dragon 32 and Commodore 64 in 1983.

Gameplay

The game takes place on several floors connected by ladders. Monsters appear on all floors. The player character is able to dig a hole in any floor. A monster falling down the hole becomes trapped for a short time. If the player then hammers at the monster while it is trapped, the monster is killed.

References

External links

1983 video games
Commodore 64 games
Dragon 32 games
Platform games
Video game clones
Video games developed in the United Kingdom